A firearm is a projectile weapon.

Firearm or fire arm may also refer to:

 Firearm (comics), a comic book series printed by Malibu Comics
 Firearm (Marvel Comics), a character in the Marvel Comics universe
 Firearms (video game), a first-person shooter
 Firearm, a character in the Lego Agents toy series